About a Boy is an American comedy television series created by Jason Katims for NBC, based on the 1998 novel of the same title by Nick Hornby and using elements from the 2002 film screenplay by Peter Hedges, Chris Weitz and Paul Weitz. The series premiered on February 22, 2014 with a special preview of the pilot episode, before moving to its regular time slot on Tuesday, March 4, 2014, 9:00 pm EST following The Voice.

Successful songwriter and bachelor Will Freeman (David Walton) lives a carefree life as the "ultimate man-child". His perfect world is turned upside down when single mom Fiona (Minnie Driver) and her charming, yet socially awkward 11-year-old son Marcus (Benjamin Stockham) move in next door.

With the exception of the pilot episode, all episodes start with the term "About a...". A total of 33 episodes have been produced over two seasons, only 27 of which aired before being canceled on May 8, 2015. The remaining six episodes were released via VoD (Amazon Prime Video, iTunes, Google Play) on July 20, 2015.

Series overview 
{| class="wikitable" style="text-align:center"
|-
! style="padding: 0 8px;" colspan="2" rowspan="2"| Season
! style="padding: 0 8px;" rowspan="2"| Episodes
! colspan="2"| Originally aired 
|-
! style="padding: 0 8px;"| First aired
! style="padding: 0 8px;"| Last aired 
|-
 |style="background: #00BFFF;"|
 | 1
 | 13
 | style="padding:0 8px;"| 
 | style="padding:0 8px;"|  
|-
 |style="background: #F7FE2E;"|	
 | 2
 | 20
 | 
 | 
|-
|}

Episodes

Season 1 (2014)

Season 2 (2014–15)

References

External links

Lists of American sitcom episodes